Xavier Ubeira (born 3 May 1970) is a Spanish former alpine skier who competed in the 1992 Winter Olympics and in the 1994 Winter Olympics.

References

1970 births
Living people
Spanish male alpine skiers
Olympic alpine skiers of Spain
Alpine skiers at the 1992 Winter Olympics
Alpine skiers at the 1994 Winter Olympics
20th-century Spanish people